Hunor Kelemen (born 18 October 1967) is a Romanian politician and Hungarian language writer. The current president of the Democratic Alliance of Hungarians in Romania (UDMR), he has been a member of the Romanian Chamber of Deputies since 2000, and was nominated as his party's candidate for the 2009, 2014, and 2019 presidential elections. From December 2009 to May 2012 he was Romania's Minister of Culture in the Emil Boc and Mihai Răzvan Ungureanu governments, a role he has reprised between March and October 2014 in the government headed by Victor Ponta.

In 2000, Hunor Kelemen was awarded the Order of the Star of Romania, Commander rank, and in 2008 Hungary's Commander's Cross of the Order of Merit. In 2012, he married Éva Czézár; the civil ceremony took place at Cârța Town Hall, while the religious wedding was held at St. Michael's Church in Cluj-Napoca.

Biography 
An ethnic Hungarian, he was born in Cârța. He completed primary school in Ineu-Ciuc, and the gymnasium in his native locality, while practising ice hockey in the school's team. After completing high school in Târgu Mureș, he enrolled in the University of Agricultural Sciences and Veterinary Medicine of Cluj-Napoca, graduating as a veterinarian in 1993, and then in the Faculty of Philosophy of the  Babeș-Bolyai University, graduating in 1998.

Following the Revolutions of 1989, Hunor Kelemen was one of the founders of the Hungarian language cultural magazines Jelenlét and later became deputy editor in chief. After 1993 he also collaborated with the Hungarian language magazine Korunk, and between 1990 and 1997 he was editor of cultural and political shows for the Radio Cluj, part of the Romanian Radio Broadcasting Company. In 1995 Hunor Kelemen published his first poetry volume in Hungarian language, Mínuszévek, for which he was awarded the Debut Prize of the Writers' Union of Romania in 1996. He further published a novel, A madárijesztők halála ("The scarecrow's death"), in 1999, and a second poetry volume, A szigetlakó ("The islander"), in 2001, both in Hungarian language.

Kelemen entered politics in 1997, when he was appointed as Secretary of State from the UDMR in the Romanian government's Ministry of Culture. He held this post until 2000, when he was elected in the lower house of the Romanian Parliament on the UDMR list. He was re-elected in 2004 and in 2008, obtaining over 50% of the votes in his electoral college in the latter elections.

In June 2009, the UDMR Council of the Union Representatives voted Hunor Kelemen as candidate for the office of President of Romania in that year's November elections. On this occasion Kelemen declared his program will include a proposal for Hungarian ethnic autonomy, in a way "that would not upset the Romanian ethnics". In July, at a summer camp  organised by the UDMR at Băile Tușnad, he acknowledged that, as a Hungarian ethnic, he had no chance to win, but he presented the motives that led to his candidature: the desire of the Hungarian community of Romania to have a candidate of its own, the need to fill the traditional Hungarian segment in Romanian politics, and the need to present the message of the Hungarian minority to the Romanian majority. He received 372,764 votes (3.83% of the ballot). He performed better in the regions with important Hungarian communities, winning a majority in the counties of Harghita (71.2%) and Covasna (52.8%), and the second place in Mureș and Satu Mare.

On December 20, 2009, Emil Boc, nominated as prime-minister by the re-elected Traian Băsescu, proposed Hunor Kelemen as the Minister of Culture in the PDL-UDMR coalition government. The proposal was met with strong protests by PDL vice-president Cezar Preda, who declared that his party made the "greatest political mistake of the last years". Following unofficial protests from the Patriarch of the Romanian Orthodox Church, the Religious Affairs, previously subordinated to the Ministry of Culture, were put under the direct control of the prime-minister. Reportedly, the Orthodox Church was dissatisfied with being subordinated to a minister of a different denomination. The cabinet was approved by the Parliament on December 23, 2009.

Kelemen left government in May 2012 when the Răzvan Ungureanu government lost a vote of confidence and was replaced by one led by Victor Ponta.

Electoral history

Presidential elections

References

External links 
 2009 campaign site  

1967 births
Living people
People from Harghita County
Romanian veterinarians
Hungarian-language writers
Babeș-Bolyai University alumni
Romanian writers
Romanian educators
Democratic Union of Hungarians in Romania politicians
Members of the Chamber of Deputies (Romania)
Commanders of the Order of the Star of Romania
Romanian Ministers of Culture
Candidates for President of Romania
Commander's Crosses of the Order of Merit of the Republic of Hungary (civil)